Robert Stuart Nathan (born August 13, 1948), usually credited as Robert Nathan, is an American novelist, journalist, screenwriter, director, and television producer.

Early life
Nathan was born in Johnstown, Pennsylvania and was raised in Clayton, Missouri. His father was a toy wholesaler and his mother an accountant. He graduated from Amherst College. He began his career in politics and print journalism, then joined the reporting staff of National Public Radio’s All Things Considered, first as New York Bureau Chief and subsequently as White House Correspondent and occasional weekend anchor. He has been a contributor to many magazines, including The New Republic, Harper's, Cosmopolitan, The New York Times Book Review, The Nation,  and elsewhere.

Novels 
Nathan is the author of four novels, including the political thriller The White Tiger, a New York Times Notable Book of the Year and a Book of the Month Club selection published in seventeen languages. The New York Times called the book “exciting, rare, and authentic.”  As half of the thriller-writing team published under the pseudonym Nicholas Condé, he is co-author of three novels, including The Religion, which was filmed as The Believers by John Schlesinger (Midnight Cowboy, Marathon Man), and In the Deep Woods, the basis for a television film starring Rosanna Arquette and Anthony Perkins in his last role.

Television 
Nathan began working in episodic television on the original staff of Law & Order'''.  He was subsequently on the original staff of ER as Co-Executive Producer and for that show received the industry’s coveted George Foster Peabody Award.  His television credits include Executive Producer and showrunner, Law & Order: Criminal Intent; Co-Executive Producer, Law & Order; Co-Executive Producer, Law & Order: SVU; Co-Executive Producer, Dragnet; Executive Producer and showrunner, ABC’s Women's Murder Club; Consulting Producer, USA’s Fairly Legal; Consulting Producer, FX’s Dirt; Executive Producer, showrunner, and co-creator, NBC’s Prince Street; and Executive Producer and showrunner, CBS’s The Client.  For episodes of Law & Order and its sequels he received an Edgar Award nomination from the Mystery Writers of America, four Emmy nominations and a Humanitas Award nomination as a producer, The Shine Award, The Silver Gavel Award, and the GLAAD Media Award.  For Paramount Television he was Executive Producer of James Ellroy’s L.A. Sheriff’s Homicide.  In the 23-year history of the Law & Order franchise, the 1993 episode “Manhood,” from Nathan's teleplay with a story co-written by Walon Green, holds the only Emmy nomination in the category Outstanding Writing for A Drama Series.

 Film 
In 2012 he directed the film Lucky Bastard, for which he co-wrote the script and for which he was also, with his writing partner Lukas Kendall, an Executive Producer.  The film premiered In Europe in competition at the Monaco Film Festival in May, 2013, where it received The Special Jury Prize and Best Screenplay Award.

Filmography
Writer

 Selected bibliography 
 Amusement Park, The Dial Press, 1977.
 Rising Higher, The Dial Press, 1981.
 The White Tiger (1987, Simon and Schuster)
 The Bushido Code, Fawcett (writing as Robert St. Louis), 1981.
 The Religion, co-writing as Nicholas Condé (1982, New American Library)
 The Legend, co-writing as Nicholas Condé (1984, New American Library)
 In the Deep Woods, co-writing as Nicholas Condé (1989, St. Martin’s Press)

 References 
 Jerome Alan Cohen, "Death Comes for the Archbureaucrat" (book review, The White Tiger), New York Times Book Review, September 6, 1987.
 "Master Craftsman," Variety, April 10, 1995.
 McGrath, Charles, "He's The Master Craftsman," New York Times, October 22, 1995.
 "Nathan Back to Wolf Pack," Variety, June 23, 2002.
 "Paramount Signs Nathan," Broadcasting & Cable'', June 30, 1997.

Footnotes

External links
 

Living people
1948 births
20th-century American male writers
20th-century American novelists
20th-century American dramatists and playwrights
American male novelists
American male dramatists and playwrights
American male screenwriters
American television writers
American screenwriters
Amherst College alumni
American male television writers